Frank B. Smith was a sailor from the Great Britain, who represented his native country at the 1908 Summer Olympics in Ryde, Great Britain. Smith took the 4th place in the 6-Metre.

Sources

British male sailors (sport)
Sailors at the 1908 Summer Olympics – 6 Metre
Olympic sailors of Great Britain
Year of birth missing
Year of death missing